Alice Catherine Evans (January 29, 1881 – September 5, 1975) was an American microbiologist. She became a researcher at the U.S. Department of Agriculture. There she investigated bacteriology in milk and cheese. She later demonstrated that Bacillus abortus (now called Brucella abortus)  caused the disease brucellosis (undulant fever or Malta fever) in both cattle and humans.

Early life and education

Evans was born the younger of two children on a farm in Neath, Bradford County, Pennsylvania, to William Howell, a farmer, and surveyor, and Anne B. Evans, a teacher. Neath was named after Neath, Wales, where Evans's paternal grandparents had emigrated from in 1831. When Evans was five and six years old, she was taught at home by her parents and then attended a one-room school house in Neath where she earned outstanding grades. In 1886, Evans survived scarlet fever, as did her brother Morgan.

She attended the Susquehanna Collegiate Institute in Towanda, where she played on a women's basketball team. Basketball was a new sport to women, and viewers were shocked by the unladylike sport. At one game, a doctor refused to treat Evans dislocated finger.

After graduating, Evans became a teacher. In her memoirs, she writes that she became a teacher because it was the only profession open to women, but she found it boring. After four years of teaching, she took a free course for rural teachers at Cornell University meant to help them inspire their students to love science and nature. After receiving a scholarship, she wanted to continue her studies in science. Cornell offered bacteriology for free tuition in order to encourage students to pursue the still new science. While at Cornell, Evans worked as a housekeeper and doing clerical work in the alumni library, earning her the nickname "the grind."  Evans earned a B.S. in bacteriology from Cornell University in 1909, and was the first woman to receive a bacteriology scholarship from the University of Wisconsin–Madison, where she earned her M.S. the following year. At the end of her studies, her professor Elmer McCollum asked if she would wish to continue her studies, offering her the school's chemistry fellowship. Due to the financial strain of her studies, though, she decided to enter the workforce.

Work and discoveries
Evans was offered a federal position at the Dairy Division of the Bureau of Animal Industry at the United States Department of Agriculture. She accepted the offer in Madison, Wisconsin, and worked there for three years. She worked on refining the process of manufacturing cheese and butter for improved flavor and investigating the sources of bacterial contamination in milk products. She was the first woman scientist to hold a permanent position as a USDA bacteriologist and as a civil servant was protected by law. Each year, Evans took one undergraduate university course, learning German in order to read research reports (prior to World War I, Germany led bacteriology).

In 1913, Evans relocated to Washington, D.C., where the USDA had finished building a new wing. The Bureau of Animal Industry tried to block women from joining them, but Evans unwittingly was admitted through a loophole. She found the Dairy Division more welcoming than the larger Bureau. While there, she worked with B.H. Rawl, Lore Alford Rogers, William Mansfield Clark, and Charles Thom. When Thom left the Dairy Division, Evans was sent to the University of Chicago to study Mycology so she could replace Thom as the mycologist.

Evans became interested in the disease brucellosis and its relationship to fresh, unpasteurized milk. Alice's investigation focused on the organism Bacillus abortus, known to cause miscarriages in animals. Alice learned that the microbe thrived in infected cows as well as animals that appeared healthy. The reports hypothesized that since the bacteria was found in cow's milk, a threat to human health was likely.

Evans decided to investigate this; she wondered whether the disease in cows could be the cause of undulant fever in humans. She warned that raw milk should be pasteurized to protect people from various diseases. She reported her findings to the Society of American Bacteriologists in 1917 and published her work in the Journal of Infectious Diseases in 1918. She was met with skepticism, particularly because she was a woman and did not have a Ph.D. After publishing, Evans decided to let the issue rest, knowing that her findings would be tested and verified with time. 

Evans joined the United States Public Health Service's Hygienic Laboratory in April 1918 to study epidemic meningitis, which was "one of the dread diseases of World War I." In October 1918, when the Spanish flu came to Washington, D.C., she was asked to change her research's focus to the flu. Early in her work studying the flu, she was infected, and was confined for a month. When soldiers returned from World War I and Streptococcus spread throughout shanties and tents they lived in, Evans changed her focus again. Her studies of streptococci continued throughout many years of her work. She observed and published about the nascent stage of phage twenty-three years before Winston R. Maxted and Richard M. Krause published similar findings.

In 1920, Dr. Karl F. Meyer and his team confirmed Evans's observation of cow's milk as a source of human brucellosis. Outbreaks in 1922 inspired Evans's continued research, which included studying blood samples and infecting a heifer with Brucella melitensis to see if it would be infected. Despite her colleagues' skepticism, Evans's work was repeatedly confirmed.

However, Dr. Theobald Smith remained an outspoken critic of Evans's discovery. In 1925, after learning that Smith had raised doubt about her findings in the National Research Council, Evans began to worry that the objections of a scientist held in such high esteem would delay the recognition of her findings. She reached out to William H. Welch, who was the  Dean of the School of Hygiene and Public Health of the Johns Hopkins University, to aid in her communications with Smith. Six months after Smith responded to a letter from Welch, asking Evans to suspend " judgment until the unknown factors responsible for or contributing to the incidence of the human cases have been brought to light," Evans was invited to sit on the National Research Council's Committee on Infectious Abortion, which was chaired by Smith. At the Hygienic Laboratory, Evans was infected with undulant fever in October 1922, a then-incurable disease that impaired her health for twenty years. Initially, Evans was diagnosed with Neurasthenia due to the lack of recognition of brucellosis. However, in 1928, doctors found lesions from which Brucella was cultivated while performing unrelated surgery on Evans, confirming her diagnosis.

Eventually, Brucella was confirmed as the disease that caused what was then known as undulant fever and Malta fever. In 1928, in recognition of her achievement, the Society of American Bacteriologists elected Evans as their president, making her the first woman to hold the position. Evans's findings led to the pasteurization of milk in 1930. As a result, the incidence of brucellosis in the United States was significantly reduced. 

Because of a hypersensitivity to brucellar antigen, Evans paused her work with brucellae. In 1936, she resumed her work, but did not handle living cultures. In this study, they surveyed three cities looking for evidence of brucellar infection and the cause.

In 1939, Evans turned her attention to Hemolytic streptococcus, which she focused on until her retirement in 1945. 

Evans donated a collection of her papers to the National Library of Medicine in 1969.

Post-retirement and death 
Evans officially retired in 1945 but continued working in the field. Following her retirement, she became a popular speaker, especially with women's groups. She gave lectures to women about career development and pursuing scientific careers. 

After being retired for sixteen years, Evans returned to writing about  brucellosis. With the advent of disability insurance, the literature began suggesting malingering as a cause for failing to recover from brucellosis, so Evans encouraged further study into the disease.

In 1966, Evans protested against the disclaimer of communist affiliation on the Medicare application, claiming that it violated her right to free speech. In January 1967, the Department of Justice agreed that it was unconstitutional and did not enforce the provision.

Evans suffered a stroke at the age of 94 and died on September 5, 1975, in Alexandria, Virginia. Her tombstone reads, "The gentle hunter, having pursued and tamed her quarry, crossed over to a new home".

Awards and honors 
 First female president of the Society of American Bacteriologists, elected in 1928 
 Awarded honorary doctoral degree in medicine from Woman's Medical College of Pennsylvania, 1934
 Awarded honorary doctorates of science from University of Wisconsin–Madison and Wilson College, 1936
 Fellow, American Association for the Advancement of Science
 Honorary president, Inter-American Committee on Brucellosis, 1945–57
 Honorary member, American Society for Microbiology, 1975
 Establishment of the Alice C. Evans Award, American Society for Microbiology, 1983
 Inducted into the National Women's Hall of Fame, 1993
 Bacterium Enemella evansiae was named after her, 2020

See also
Timeline of women in science

References

Further reading
 Evans, Alice C (1963). Memoirs. National Institutes of Health.
Burns, Virginia Law (1993). Gentle Hunter. Enterprise Press. .

External links

Alice Evans, Women of the Hall, National Women's Hall of Fame
  (slides)
  (slides with 6 references)

1881 births
1975 deaths
American people of Welsh descent
Cornell University College of Agriculture and Life Sciences alumni
University of Wisconsin–Madison College of Agricultural and Life Sciences alumni
American microbiologists
20th-century American women scientists
Women microbiologists
20th-century American scientists